Haloarcula hispanica SH1 virus is a double-stranded DNA virus that infects the archaeon Haloarcula hispanica. This virus has a number of unique features that were unlike any other known virus when it was described. However similarities have since been found with the Thermus thermophilus virus P23-77 and the Thermus aquaticus virus IN93. These viruses may form a new taxon when in the next revision of the taxonomy by the ICTV.


Virology
The virons are icosahedral in shape with a triangulation number of 28. The capsomers are decorated with a tower like structures and contain an inner lipid membrane lies beneath the protein capsid. The lipid membrane contains phosphatidylglycerol, phosphatidylglycerophosphate methyl ester and phosphatidylglycerosulfate. The base of the capsomer appears to be formed by a hexameric single beta barrel protein.

There are 15 structural proteins in the capsid varying in molecular weight between 185 kiloDaltons (kDa) and 4 kDa. These have been numbered from VP1 to VP 15. Seven appear to be minor components (VP5, VP6, VP8, VP11, VP13, VP14 and VP15).

VP12 (molecular weight 9.8 kDa) has two membrane spanning helices suggesting it is an integral membrane protein.

VP2 may be an elongated fiber like protein suitable for forming a spike.

Genome
The genome is linear 30,898 base pairs in length and contains 309 base pair inverted terminal repeat sequences. The G+C content is 68.4%. It encodes 56 open reading frames (ORFs).

The structural proteins correspond to the ORFs as follows:
 ORF13 – VP1
 ORF23 – VP12
 ORF24 – VP7
 ORF25 – VP4
 ORF27 – VP13
 ORF28 – VP2
 ORF29 – VP5
 ORF30 – VP10
 ORF31 – VP9
 ORF32 – VP3
 ORF33 – VP6

All the structural proteins are located in the middle of the genome.

ORF 17 encodes a protein with ATPase domain.

References

Double-stranded DNA viruses